Irén Győrffy (10 February 1920 – 30 October 1950) was a Hungarian swimmer. She competed in the women's 100 metre backstroke at the 1936 Summer Olympics.

References

1920 births
1950 deaths
Olympic swimmers of Hungary
Swimmers at the 1936 Summer Olympics
Place of birth missing
Hungarian female backstroke swimmers
20th-century Hungarian women